The play-off round of 2006 UEFA European Under-21 Championship qualification was held on 11–13 and 15–16 November 2005. Winners of play-off round qualified to the championship played following year in May and June, where Portugal was chosen to host the fixtures.

Matches

|}

First leg

Second leg

Germany won 3–0 on aggregate

France won 3–2 on aggregate

Italy won 2–1 on aggregate

Serbia and Montenegro won 5–2 on aggregate

Denmark won 4–1 on aggregate

Netherlands won 2–0 on aggregate

Ukraine won 5–4 on aggregate

Portugal won 3–2 on aggregate

References

External links
 Play-offs at UEFA.com

Play-offs
Play-offs
UEFA European Under-21 Championship qualification play-offs